Manaiyeripatti is a village in the Thanjavur taluk of Thanjavur district, Tamil Nadu, India.

Demographics 

As per the 2001 census, Manaiyeripatti had a total population of 2088 with  1055 males and  1031 females. The sex ratio was 975. The literacy rate was 61.94.

References 

 

Villages in Thanjavur district